Zulm-O-Sitam is a 1998 Hindi film starring Dharmendra, Shatrughan Sinha, Jaya Prada, Arjun Sarja, Madhoo in lead roles and was directed by K. C. Bokadia.

Cast

 Dharmendra as SP Arun
 Shatrughan Sinha as Advocate Vishwanath
 Jaya Prada as Aarti
 Arjun Sarja as Arjun
 Madhoo as Meena 
 Prem Chopra as Dharamdas
 Shakti Kapoor as Imli Dada
 Mukesh Khanna as Inspector Liyaqat Khan
 Mukesh Rishi as Police Commissioner
 Gulshan Grover as Tiger
 Danny Denzongpa as Sikandar
 Mahesh Anand as Banjara
 Vikas Anand as Journalist Dinanath
 Milind Gunaji as Inspector Sher Khan
 Kishore Bhanushali as Raju Guide
 Ram Mohan as Senior Police Officer
 Mac Mohan as Mac
 Yunus Parvez as Defending Lawyer
 Dina Pathak as Meena's Grandmother 
 Shiva Rindani as Rana
 Aasif Sheikh as Eve Teaser
 Sudhir as Sikandar's Henchman
 Sanghavi as Special appearance in the song "Masti Masti Mere Man Mein"

Story
Superintendent of Police Arun is a hardworking, honest and diligent police officer in Bombay. He has been assigned to lead the detail in charge of the state's Chief Minister's protection. Things do not go as planned, and the Chief Minister is killed. The police find evidence linking Arun with this killing, and have him arrested and imprisoned. Arun loudly claims he in innocent, but if he is innocent, who actually was involved in this killing?

Release
The film was dubbed into Tamil as Arjuna.

Music
 "Aankh Lad Gayi" - Kumar Sanu, Poornima
 "Dil Tujhe Main Dunga" - Udit Narayan, Sadhana Sargam
 "Kabhi To Mohabbat Kabhi To Ladaai" - Shabbir Kumar, Vijeta Pandit
 "Main Deewana Main Mastana" - Udit Narayan
 "Masti Masti Mere Man Mein" - Sudesh Bhosle, Poornima

References

External links
 

1998 films
1990s Hindi-language films
Films scored by Aadesh Shrivastava
Films directed by K. C. Bokadia